Tinkers Alley also known as Coppersmith alley is an old urban downtown which was built in the first half of 18th century. It was a street full of tinkers and other crafts, together with craftsmen houses deriving from Turkish period.

Unfortunately, only one part from those houses was preserved today and protected as one structural building wholeness. The alley is protected by the state as a complex of great architectural value. Now the street has many cafes and restaurants.

Location 
Tinkers Alley is located in the City of Niš, Serbia and it is facing the Kalča, which is a  shopping center.

References 

Streets of Niš